Dušanovo may refer to:

 Bačko Dušanovo, a village in the municipality of Subotica, Serbia
 Dušanovo, Leskovac, a village in the municipality of Leskovac, Serbia
 , a village in the municipality of Prizren, Kosovo; see List of populated places in Kosovo
 Dušanovo (Gradiška), a settlement near Gradiška, Bosnia and Herzegovina